Hants County is an historical county and census division of Nova Scotia, Canada. Local government is provided by the West Hants Regional Municipality, and the Municipality of the District of East Hants.

History

Formation 
The county of Hants was established June 17, 1781, on territory taken from Kings County and consisted of the townships of Windsor, Falmouth and Newport. The name Hants is an old abbreviation for the English county of Hampshire, from the Old English name Hantescire. In 1861, Hants County was divided for court sessional purposes into two districts named East Hants and West Hants. In 1879, the two districts were incorporated as district municipalities. In 2020, the Town of Windsor amalgamated with the District of West Hants to become the West Hants Regional Municipality.

18th century - origins

Miꞌkmaq

The Miꞌkmaq are the indigenous peoples who lived on these lands for centuries. In the course of their historical relationship with the Acadians, many Miꞌkmaq became Catholic and therefore played an active role in the Acadian resistance to the Protestant British annexation of Hants County. They were clearly supporters of Abbe LeLoutre's work in protecting Acadian and Miꞌkmaq and ultimately Catholic interests in the region. Within Hants County, they fought in the Battle at St. Croix on the St. Croix River.

There is a long history of missionary work in Hants County, such as the work of Silas Tertius Rand's work on Glooscap First Nation near Hantsport. There are still Miꞌkmaq communities in Hants County such as Indian Brook 14 (the home of the famous activist Anna Mae Aquash) and Shubenacadie 13. Shubenacadie is the oldest community in Hants County. There is a significant monument in the middle of the reserve to Major Jean-Baptiste Cope, the signatory to the peace Treaty of 1752 with the British, which was recently upheld by the Supreme Court of Canada (1985).

Acadians 

The first Acadians to settle in present-day Hants County (known as Pisiguit) established farms at (present day Falmouth) in the early 1680s, as the 1686 census shows a number of families on well established farms utilizing dyked pastures. More Acadian villages soon followed spreading along the shores of the Piziquid and St. Croix rivers. One of these was at present day Windsor. With an expanding population the region by 1722 was split into two parishes (see Pisiquit). The l'Assomption parish church was situated on a hill overlooking the confluence of the Pisiquit and Saint Croix rivers where in 1750 it was pulled down by the Acadians under orders from the British to make way for Fort Edward. By the early 1700s Acadians migrated all along the shore of Hants County to the Shubenacadie River. One of the most prominent Acadians from this area was Noël Doiron who is the namesake of the community of Noel. With the founding of both Halifax (1749) and Fort Edward, there was an Acadian Exodus that involved an emigration of most of the Acadians from the Municipality of East Hants (1750) and from West Hants (Pisiguit) as well. They left British Nova Scotia for French occupied Prince Edward Island. During the 1755 Expulsion of the Acadians the majority of those Acadians remaining were deported to various locations along the eastern seaboard of the Thirteen Colonies, most notably New England and Maryland. The Expulsion of the Acadians from Hants County began at exactly the same time as it happened at Grand-Pré, with the Acadian men being imprisoned within the walls of Fort Edward. Fort Edward was one of four British forts in Acadia to imprison Acadians throughout the nine years of the expulsion.

New England Planters 

After the Acadians were removed from the area of present-day Hants County, New England Planters began to arrive and settle the vacated lands (1760). They formed the townships of Windsor, Falmouth and Newport. Many arrived from Rhode Island. One of the Planters of note during this period was Henry Alline who led the New Light revival of the Great Awakening in the region. Alline's movement had a significant impact on the stance the New Englander Planters took with respect to the troubles building in the colonies to the west, between their British masters, and brethren who remained in New England, that led to the Revolutionary War. Alline's Newlight congregations were the progenitors of the Baptist movement in Canada.

Ulster Irish 
The next wave of immigration to Hants County was the Ulster Scots people who settled all along the Cobequid shore such as the O'Briens in Noel (1771) and the Putnams in Maitland.

American Loyalists 
During the American Revolution, Fort Edward played a pivotal role defending Halifax from a possible land attack and serving as the headquarters in Atlantic Canada for 84th Regiment of Foot (Royal Highland Emigrants). After the American Revolution, the Rawdon Township and Douglas Township were created for American Loyalists (1784). The Douglas Township (Kennetcook and area) was settled by the 84th Regiment of Foot. The Rawdon Township was settled by loyalists from South Carolina whose lives had been saved in the Siege of Ninety-Six by Lord Rawdon and the 84th Regiment of Foot.

19th century - shipbuilding and confederation

Plaster War 
Windsor developed its gypsum deposits, usually selling it to American markets at Passamaquoddy Bay. Often this trade was illegal. In 1820 an effort to stop this smuggling trade resulted in the "Plaster War", in which local smugglers resoundingly defeated the efforts of New Brunswick officials to bring the trade under their control.

Shipbuilding 
Productive timber lands and tidal building sites made Hants County an important shipbuilding centre in the 19th century. Loyalist merchant Abraham Cunard was an early shipbuilder in the county. Cunard's efforts were surpassed by much larger yards by the mid 19th century, including the William Dawson Lawrence shipyard in Maitland which built the William D. Lawrence, the largest wooden ship ever built in Canada, and Ezra Churchill's in Hantsport.

The Great Hants Campaign (1869)

The Honourable Joseph Howe was the first member of parliament for Hants County (1867). He campaigned in the county with an agenda to punish those politicians who have forced Nova Scotia to participate in the formation, and become a part of Canada without a mandate or referendum from the people. Over the next two years in office, deciding not to mobilize to join America or become a colony independent of Britain, Howe determined that Nova Scotia's best option was to remain in Canada and to fight for "better terms. While most Nova Scotians remained supportive of the Anti-Confederation Campaign during this time period, Howe ran in Hants County bi-election of 1869 to get a mandate from the people to see if they wanted him to continue to support Nova Scotia's entry into Canada. What ensued was one of the most expensive political campaigns in Nova Scotia's history. The whole country watched to see if Howe would be returned to Ottawa to lead Nova Scotia into Confederation on the best terms possible. Howe toured the whole county and eventually won, which eventually led to all of Nova Scotia accepting Canada.

20th century 

Hants County produced two Olympians, both of whom came from along the Noel shore (see Athletics at the 1928 Summer Olympics – Men's marathon). Along with the great literary figure in Nova Scotia's history, Thomas Chandler Haliburton, Hants produced Alden Nowlan, George Elliott Clarke and others. The celebrated folk artist Sidney Kelsie who later made his career in Edmonton, Alberta was born in Hants County in 1928. Folk singer Stan Rogers made the community of Rawdon famous by writing the song "The Rawdon Hills".

Natural resources: wood, fish, gypsum, barite, oil and gold
The wood in the county was both used to build the many wooden ships, but it was also used as an export resource on the wooden ships. For this purpose, the Midland Railway was also built through the County (1901), connecting Windsor and Truro.

The county is noted for very large deposits of gypsum, some of which was at one time shipped from Walton. The world's largest open pit gypsum mine is located in Milford, East Hants and currently produces approximately 8,000 tons of gypsum daily. George Elliot Clarke's poem, "West Hants County", tells of the difficult condition of black workers in the gypsum mines.

Barite was also an extremely important ore to Hants County. The largest barite mine in the world was in Walton and that; combined with the gypsum and lumbering, made Walton the second busiest port in Nova Scotia in the 1950s. The mine produced in total 4.5 million tonnes of barite, between 1941 and 1978. Silver, lead, zinc and copper were also found in the same mine and over 360,000 tonnes were mined. It is estimated that there are still about 1 million tonnes of barite left in the deposit.
 
Gold was mined at Renfrew, near Nine Mile River, The village was the home of one of the largest gold mines in the province. There were other gold mines in the community of Rawdon Gold Mines. There is currently oil exploration in and around Kennetcook.

Communities

Towns
Hantsport
Windsor

Reserves
Indian Brook 14

Municipalities
Municipality of the District of East Hants
West Hants Regional Municipality

Demographics 

Population trend

Mother tongue language (2011)

Ethnic groups (2006)

Access routes
Highways and numbered routes that run through the county, including external routes that start or finish at the county limits:

Highways

Trunk routes

Collector routes:

External routes:
None

Notable residents 

Henry Alline
Anna Mae Aquash
Buck 65
Ezra Churchill
George Elliott Clarke
Jean-Baptiste Cope
Noël Doiron
Thomas Chandler Haliburton
William Hall
Julia Archibald Holmes
William Dawson Lawrence
Julia McCarthy
Anne McLellan
Alden Nowlan
Jacques-Pierre Peminuit Paul

See also
List of communities in Nova Scotia
Mount Uniacke, Nova Scotia
Richard John Uniacke

References

External links

Photographs of historic monuments in Hants County